KoramGame is an international software developer and publisher and subsidiary of Koram Games Limited, which is itself a subsidiary company of the Kunlun Group. 

The Kunlun Group is an international company based in China that specializes in the development for online browser-based games, PC games, iOS games, Android games, software distribution, and other internet services.

KoramGame is primarily engaged in the development and distribution of online games, with the production of mobile games as its core mandate, as well as the operation of software application stores. The company distributes its products in domestic and overseas markets.

KoramGame has published many of Kunlun's games in nine languages, including English, French, Spanish, German, Japanese and Chinese. The company was started in March 2008. In 2010 their first game was launched in Malaysia, and their first Bahasa web game in Indonesia.

Most of KoramGame's published game titles are freemium, with the core game free to download and play; special characters, new abilities and bonuses are awarded through "Kcoins”, which are purchased with real-world currency.

Games

 Three Kingdoms ChinaJoy Browser Game of the Year in 2009.
 Kungfu Online DigiChina Outstanding Browser Game of the Year in 2009.
 Indomitus Relive the wars and struggles of barbarian tribes that have been forgotten by history, fighting against overwhelming legions of Roman soldiers.
 Seal: New World "Rascal Rabbits" face off in a 3D MMO world.
 Angry Birds: Ace Fighter is a game which korangame teamed up with Rovio. It is an airplane shooter game. The company announced its cancellation on September 6, 2016. Later, on October 8 that year, servers were permanently shut down.
 Wartune MMORPG strategy/RPG hybrid game featuring thousand-player boss battles, a robust guild system, and farming.
 Arcadia A 3D MMO set in a bizarre fantasy world.
 Rift Hunter A space fantasy where players must seal rifts to save a kingdom.
 Steel Avengers An interactive MMO strategy tank game that awakens your military instinct.  As Commander, amass your troops and do battle with thousands of tank fans.
 Everlight Choose to be a Mage, Oracle, Ranger or Warrior in a fantasy world full of live myths, legends, and lost civilizations, including Atlantis, Greek mythology, and the ancient Mayans.
 Call of Gods Tasked with building castles and exploring dungeons, players choose from one of three races – human, elves, and undead, to conquer the landscape; followed by NPC heroes who learn from their fighting styles.
 Goddess: Primal Chaos Players travel back through time to save humanity and the spirit world.
 Heroes of Chaos Choose Warriors, Summoners, or Bloodline and battle to gain supremacy for your guild.  Similar to World of Warcraft and League of Legends.
 League of Angels An MMORPG browser game with mystical fantasy kingdoms.  Freeing angels from their dreamless slumber as you progress through the game.  These angels will in turn help you in battles.
 Dynasty Saga Experience the Chinese Dynasty and fight your way to the top for your chosen kingdom.
 Mythopolis A Facebook game set in the time of ancient myths.  Play for Troy, Sparta or Athens and trade resources with other players to build the best city.
 Dragon Legion A multiplayer online card battle game where players collect and summon an army of mythical heroes and beasts.
 King of Kung Fu A martial arts mobile game similar to Street Fighter.
 CEO Dream A now-defunct Facebook game, which allowed players to step into the shoes of a CEO.
 Sword of Chaos Players are angels, learning magic skills to defeat armies of fierce creatures.  Varied gameplay including tower defense, world bosses, arenas, and massive 20 vs 20 PVP battles.  Players' wings change as they level up.
 Spirit Tales Marketed as "the cutest MMO ever”, with over 40 million unique character customizations, players battle their way across a continent of fierce monsters to take back their homeland.
 Dragon Born Players quest and slay their way through dungeons as Humans who are stuck in the middle of a vicious war between Dragons and Demons. A real-time strategy massively multiplayer online game.
 Serenia Fantasy A browser-based, massively multiplayer online 2D combat RPG. Serenia's pixel art and animations are a throw-back to 1990s-era RPGs. Players can turn into different kinds of monsters, and can collect over 200 “Spirits”. Serenia has a host of exclusive gameplay modes to choose from, such as Masquerade, Werewolf Hunting, and Bonfire Gold Filling, as well as hidden quests and dungeons.
 Clash of Kingdoms A real-time strategy massively multiplayer online Adobe Flash game based on the Three Kingdoms era of Chinese history.
 Chronicles of Merlin. Players vie for the conquest of medieval England, as depicted in the stories of King Arthur. They build armies, train heroes to lead them and battle the computer or other players.
Dragon Nest M Global. A mobile adaptation of MMO Dragon Nest, which was released to the North American market in June 2018.

References

Video game publishers
Video game development companies